Villanueva is one of eight parishes (administrative divisions) in Navia, a municipality within the province and autonomous community of Asturias, in northern Spain.

Villages
 Armental
 Balmeón (Valmeón)
 Buenaavist
 Cabanella
 La Colorada
 La Mabona (Llamabúa)
 La Venta
 Las Aceñas (Las Acenias)
 Salcedo
 Talarén

Parishes in Navia